Track automation or sometimes only automation refers to the recording or handling of time-based controlling data in time-based computer applications such as digital audio workstations, video editing software and computer animation software.

Some Examples

Multitrack audio software

In modern DAWs every parameter that exists can usually be automatised, be it settings for a track's volume, applied filters or a virtual instruments.
Either the user turns some knobs/faders/etc on a physical controller connected to the computer or the user can set keyframes with the mouse, between which the computer interpolates, or the user can draw entire data curves.

Some examples:

 The volume of a track can sometimes or constantly change (fade-in/out/over)
 The panning of a sound might change
 A filter sweep (more or less intensive filter, or the frequency limits might change)

Animation software
The user sets some keyframes for i.e. position/rotation/size of an object or the position/angle/focus of a camera, and this movement data can be altered over time.

Video editing software
Blending between 2 clips. The track automation curve affects how one image changes into the other, be it slow/fast with/without acceleration, maybe even back and forth if one uses a Sinus-like wave.

See also
 MIDI
 Control voltage

External links
Audio Visual Equipment

Audio engineering